Sophie Dahl (born Sophie Holloway on 15 September 1977, later taking her mother's name for professional reasons) is an English author and former fashion model. Her first novel, The Man with the Dancing Eyes, was published in 2003 followed by Playing With the Grown-ups in 2007. In 2009, she wrote Miss Dahl's Voluptuous Delights, a cookery book which formed the basis for a six-part BBC Two series named The Delicious Miss Dahl. In 2011, she published her second cookery book From Season to Season. Her first children's book, Madame Badobedah, was released in 2019. She is the daughter of Tessa Dahl and Julian Holloway and the granddaughter of author Roald Dahl, actress Patricia Neal, and actor Stanley Holloway.

Early life and education 
Dahl was born in London in 1977 to the actor Julian Holloway and the writer Tessa Dahl. Dahl's parents separated shortly after her birth. Through her mother, Dahl has three half-siblings. As a child, Sophie frequently spent time at both her maternal and paternal grandparents' houses in Great Missenden, Buckinghamshire and East Preston, West Sussex, respectively. Dahl has noted that her childhood was "an odd one, but with such magic". Dahl attended 10 schools and lived in 17 homes in various locations including London, New York, and India.

Career

Modelling 
At a size 16, Dahl was initially a plus-size model, referred to as "voluptuous"; losing weight during her twenties, she would subsequently model at a size some "considered too thin". Dahl considered her initial size "puppy fat", and considered it "funny ... that there has always been such a fuss made about" her weight loss. Dahl started modelling at the age of 18 after a meeting with Isabella Blow, who was then an editor at British Vogue. The following year Dahl made her debut on the catwalk at Lainey Keogh's London fashion week show, modelling Autumn/Winter knitwear. She then went on to appear in advertising campaigns for Versace, Alexander McQueen, Boucheron, Pringle, Godiva, Banana Republic, Gap and Boodles amongst others. She appeared on the covers of both British and Italian Vogue, along with the covers of Elle, Harpers Bazaar, Red, Numero, and Tatler.

During her career as a model, Dahl worked with photographers including Richard Avedon, Peter Lindbergh, Tim Walker, Steven Klein and Steven Meisel. In 2000, Dahl became the face of Yves Saint-Laurent's Opium. The ad campaign was art-directed by Tom Ford and shot by Steven Meisel.  Dahl's nude images in British advertisements caused a near-record number of complaints to the UK's Advertising Standards Authority.

Writing 
In 2003 Dahl published her first book, an illustrated novella and Times bestseller, The Man with the Dancing Eyes (Bloomsbury Publishing). From 2005 Dahl was a contributing editor and regular columnist at Men's Vogue, prior to its closure in 2008. Dahl is the author of four other books: Playing with the Grown-Ups (2007) and two cook books, Miss Dahl's Voluptuous Delights (2009) and From Season To Season (2011). She was a contributor to an anthology, Truth or Dare, edited by Justine Picardie, which included works by Zoë Heller and William Fiennes. She also provided introductions to the Puffin Classic new edition of The Secret Garden by Frances Hodgson Burnett, and the Virago Press re-issue of Stella Gibbons' 1938 novel Nightingale Wood – both released in April 2009 – and Nancy Mitford's Don't Tell Alfred, reissued by Penguin in March 2010.

In March and April 2010 a six-part cookery series, "The Delicious Miss Dahl", which Dahl wrote and presented, was broadcast on BBC 2. She wrote and presented a social history documentary about the Victorian cook Isabella Beeton, which was transmitted on BBC 2 on 29 September 2011. 

Dahl was a contributing editor at British magazine Vogue for a decade, writing about subjects from cultural identity and the journey of refugees to Britain to the Proustian response to scent, winning a Jasmine Award for her column. She is a contributing editor at Conde Nast Traveller, and has written essays for amongst others, The Guardian, the American edition of Vogue, The Observer and The New York Times Magazine.

It was announced in the Bookseller in 2019 that Dahl had been signed to a four-book deal with Walker Books. The first of these, Madame Badoebdah, a children's picture book illustrated by Lauren O'Hara, was published in October 2019. Dahl's second book with Walker, The Worst Sleepover in the World, illustrated by Luciano Lozano, will be published in October 2021.

In 2020 Dahl became a monthly columnist and contributing editor at House & Garden magazine.

Personal life 
Dahl's paternal grandparents were the actor Stanley Holloway and his wife, Violet ( Lane), a former chorus dancer. Dahl's paternal lineage has been associated with the stage since at least 1850; Charles Bernard (1830–1894), a great-uncle to Stanley Holloway, was a Shakespearean actor and theatre manager in London and the English provinces. Bernard's son, Oliver Percy Bernard OBE MC (1881–1939), was an architect and scenic designer, responsible for the sets for Sir Thomas Beecham's Ring Cycle at Covent Garden. Through Bernard, Dahl is related to his sons, the poet and translator Oliver Bernard, the photographer Bruce Bernard, and the writer Jeffrey Bernard. Dahl's maternal grandparents were the author Roald Dahl and the American actress Patricia Neal.

On 9 January 2010 Dahl married the singer Jamie Cullum. They had their first child, a daughter named Lyra, in March 2011. The couple had a second daughter, Margot, in March 2013. The family live in Buckinghamshire.

Dahl is an ambassador at Place2Be, a charity who provide mental health support and advocacy in schools across the UK.

Bibliography

References

Sources

External links 
 
 
 

1977 births
Living people
British female models
British people of Norwegian descent
British people of American descent                      
British people of Welsh descent
British women writers
People educated at Millfield
British food writers
Plus-size models
Models from London
People educated at Millfield Preparatory School
Women food writers
Women cookbook writers
Sophie